Armpit fetishism (also known as maschalagnia) is a type of partialism in which a person is sexually attracted to armpits, which may lead to axillism, or armpit intercourse (sexual activity with one or both armpits).

Smell
The natural body smell is a powerful force in sexual attraction, and can be focused by the strong pungent odor of the armpit: Alex Comfort considered that for a woman to shave her armpits was “simply ignorant vandalism”, obliterating a powerful sexual tool, and praised the French for greater sexual awareness than American deodorant culture in this regard.

A woman's armpits, armpit hair, and secretions can be seen as essential components of their femininity, whether this is positively or negatively valued. Havelock Ellis found evidence that (in a non-sexual context) smelling one's own armpit could act as a temporary energy boost.

Certain pheromones found in armpit sweat, namely androstadienone is shown to improve mood when smelled or licked according to a 2013 study.

Fetish

Those who have a mild fetish for armpits often enjoy licking, kissing, tasting, tickling and smelling their partner's armpits during sexual foreplay, perhaps asking partners not to shower or wash their armpits nor wear deodorant for a period of hours or even days.

The symbolic equation of armpit and vagina may underpin the fetish, as also the odor. Sigmund Freud however saw such fetishism as becoming problematic only when such preparatory acts substituted totally for intercourse as a final goal.

Axillism
Stressing the importance in axillism of the (unlubricated) friction being confined to the penile shaft, Alex Comfort saw armpit intercourse as "Not an outstandingly rewarding trick but worth trying if you like the idea".

Problems may, however, arise in a relationship when penis to armpit contact (axillism) becomes an exclusive sexual necessity for the armpit fetishist – something which can produce long-term sexual desire disorder in a couple.

Literary associations
 The French novelist Huysmans wrote an essay 'Le Gousset' on the various smells of what he called the "spice-boxes" that were women's armpits.
 Havelock Ellis quotes a Chinese poet writing to his lover of "your odorous armpit ... that embalsamed nest".
 The folk-tale motif of vagina in armpit is known from Ohio to the East Indies.

See also

References

Sexual fetishism
Human body
Non-penetrative sex